Vila Velha de Ródão is a municipality in the district of Castelo Branco in Portugal. The population in 2011 was 3,521, in an area of 329.91 km2.

The present mayor is Maria Carmo Sequeira, elected by the Socialist Party. The municipal holiday is the Monday after the 4th Sunday of August.

In 1762, it was the site of the Battle of Vila Velha.

On 5 November 2007, a road accident on A23 killed 15 people and injured 22.

Climate

Parishes
Administratively, the municipality is divided into 4 civil parishes (freguesias):
 Fratel
 Perais
 Sarnadas de Ródão
 Vila Velha de Ródão

Notable people
Armindo Monteiro (1896 – 1955) a university professor, businessman, diplomat and politician 
Manuel Cargaleiro (born 1927 in Vila Velha de Ródão) an artist who creates ceramic and painting

Powerboat Racing
In October 2020, Vila Velha de Ródão hosted the final two rounds of the UIM F2 World Championship. The series was won by Portuguese driver Duarte Benavente.

External links
Municipality official website
Photos from Vila Velha de Ródão

References

Towns in Portugal
Populated places in Castelo Branco District
Municipalities of Castelo Branco District